Now In America (formerly Making It In America) was a news program airing on HLN, which premiered on September 24, 2012. It is hosted by Susan Hendricks. In early May 2013, the show was renamed Now In America.

References

External links
 Official Page

2010s American television news shows